1999 in sports describes the year's events in world sport.

Alpine skiing
 Alpine Skiing World Cup
 Men's overall season champion: Lasse Kjus, Norway
 Women's overall season champion: Alexandra Meissnitzer, Austria

American football
 Super Bowl XXXIII – the Denver Broncos (AFC) won 34–19 over the Atlanta Falcons (NFC)
Location: Pro Player Stadium
Attendance: 74,803
MVP: John Elway, QB (Denver)
 April 17 – Quarterback Tim Couch is selected by the Cleveland Browns with the first overall pick in the 1999 NFL Draft.
 St. Louis Rams Quarterback Kurt Warner named NFL MVP
 St. Louis Rams Head coach Dick Vermeil named NFL Coach of the Year
 Indianapolis Colts running back Edgerrin James named NFL Rookie of the Year
 Fiesta Bowl (1998 season):
 The Tennessee Volunteers claim the first ever BCS National Championship 23–16 over the Florida State Seminoles
 November 1 – death of Walter Payton (45), Chicago Bears running back

Artistic gymnastics
 1999 World Artistic Gymnastics Championships – held in Tianjin, China
 Women's team champions: Romania
 Women's all-around champion: Maria Olaru, Romania
 Women's vault champion: Elena Zamolodchikova, Russian Federation
 Women's floor exercise champion: Andreea Răducan, Romania
 Women's uneven bars champion: Svetlana Khorkina, Russian Federation
 Women's balance beam champion: Ling Jie, China
 Men's team champions: China
 Men's all-around champion: Nikolai Kryukov, Russian Federation
 Men's horizontal bar champion: Jesús Carballo, Spain
 Men's parallel bars champion: Lee Joo-hyung, South Korea
 Men's pommel horse champion: Alexei Nemov, Russian Federation
 Men's floor exercise champion: Alexei Nemov, Russian Federation
 Men's still rings champion: Dong Zhen, China
 Men's vault champion: Li Xiaopeng, China

Association football
 Champions League – Manchester United F.C. beat FC Bayern Munich 2 – 1 to win the treble having already won the English premiership and FA Cup.
 UEFA Cup – Parma F.C. beat Olympique Marseille 3–0
 Copa Libertadores – Palmeiras beat Deportivo Cali 4–3 after penalties
 Asian Club Championship  – Júbilo Iwata beat Esteghlal 2-1
 CAF Champions League – Raja Casablanca beat Espérance 4-3 after penalties
 FIFA Women's World Cup – USA beat China 5-4 after penalties.

Athletics
 August – 1999 World Championships in Athletics held at Seville
 Hicham El Guerrouj sets a new world record for the mile.  He recorded a time of 3:43.13, barely edging out Noah Ngeny who recorded 3:43.40.
 Michael Johnson sets a new world record in the 400 metres in 43.18.

Baseball
 May 10 –  The Boston Red Sox beat the Seattle Mariners, 12–4, as shortstop Nomar Garciaparra hits three home runs, including two grand slams; one in the first inning, and one in the eighth. Nomar is the 9th in MLB history (the first since Robin Ventura in 1995) to hit two grand slams in the same game, and the first Red Sox player to accomplish the feat since Jim Tabor in 1939.
 July 18 – David Cone pitches a perfect game, the 16th in history, as the Yankees defeat the Montreal Expos, 6–0, to celebrate Yogi Berra Day.
 Texas Rangers Catcher Iván Rodríguez named AL MVP
 Atlanta Braves 3B Chipper Jones named NL MVP
 Kansas City Royals OF Carlos Beltrán named AL Rookie of the Year
 Cincinnati Reds Pitcher Scott Williamson named NL Rookie of the Year
 World Series – New York Yankees won 4 games to 0 over the Atlanta Braves. The series MVP: Mariano Rivera, New York
 Miami Hurricanes defeat Florida State Seminoles in the College World Series

Basketball
 1999 NBA Finals – the San Antonio Spurs defeat the New York Knicks, 4 games to 1, to win the franchise's first championship. The Spurs also became the first former ABA team to win an NBA title, while the Knicks were the first number eight seed in NBA history to make it to the NBA Finals. This season also marked the beginning of both the Spurs dynasty and the Tim Duncan era, who would win 4 more championships in the next 15 years. 
 Utah Jazz forward Karl Malone named NBA MVP for the second time in his career
 Toronto Raptors Guard/Forward Vince Carter named NBA Rookie of the Year
 NCAA Men's Basketball Championship –
 Connecticut wins 77–74 over Duke
 Duke Blue Devils forward Elton Brand named Naismith College Player of the Year & John R. Wooden Award
 WNBA Finals – The Houston Comets defeat the New York Liberty, 2 games to 1, to win their third title in a row.
 National Basketball League (Australia) Finals:
 Adelaide 36ers defeated the Victoria Titans 2–1 in the best–of–three final series.

Boxing
 July 31 to August 8 – Pan American Games held at Winnipeg
 August 20 to August 27 – 1999 World Amateur Boxing Championships held at Houston
 September 18 – The Fight of the Millennium:
 Félix Trinidad defeats Oscar De La Hoya by split 12-round decision to unify the IBF and WBC's world Welterweight championships.

Canadian football
 Grey Cup – Hamilton Tiger-Cats win 32–21 over the Calgary Stampeders
 Vanier Cup – Laval Rouge et Or win 14–10 over the Saint Mary's Huskies

Cricket
 Cricket World Cup Final: Australia beat Pakistan by eight wickets
 Playing for Himachal Pradesh against Jammu and Kashmir in the Ranji Trophy, Rajiv Nayyar becomes the first and only player in first-class cricket history to bat for over 1,000 minutes in an innings, scoring 271 in 1,015 minutes.

Curling
 World Curling Championships –
 Men: Scotland won 6–5 over Canada
 Women: Sweden won 8–5 over USA

Cycling
 Giro d'Italia won by Ivan Gotti of Italy
 Tour de France – Lance Armstrong of the United States
 UCI Road World Championships – Men's road race – Óscar Freire of Spain

Dogsled racing
 Iditarod Trail Sled Dog Race Champion –
 Doug Swingley with lead dogs: Stormy, Cola & Elmer

Field hockey
 Men's Champions Trophy: Australia
 Women's Champions Trophy: Australia

Figure skating
 World Figure Skating Championship –
 Men's champion: Alexei Yagudin, Russia
 Ladies' champion: Maria Butyrskaya, Russia
 Pairs' champions: Yelena Berezhnaya & Anton Sikharulidze, Russia
 Ice dancing champions: Anjelika Krylova & Oleg Ovsyannikov, Russia
 European Figure Skating Championships –
 Men's champion: Alexei Yagudin, Russia
 Ladies' champion: Maria Butyrskaya, Russia
 Pairs' champions: Maria Petrova & Alexei Tikhonov, Russia
 Ice dancing champions: Anjelika Krylova & Oleg Ovsyannikov, Russia

Floorball 
 Women's World Floorball Championships
 Champion: Finland
 European Cup
 Men's champion: Warberg IC
 Women's champion: Tapanilan Erä

Gaelic Athletic Association
 Camogie
 All–Ireland Camogie Champion: Tipperary
 National Camogie League: Cork
 Gaelic football
 All-Ireland Senior Football Championship – Meath 1–11 beat Cork 1–8
 National Football League – Cork 0–12 beat Dublin 1–7
 Ladies' Gaelic football
 All–Ireland Senior Football Champion: Mayo
 National Football League: Monaghan
 Hurling
 All-Ireland Senior Hurling Championship – Cork 0–13 beat Kilkenny 0–12
 National Hurling League – Tipperary 1-14 beat Galway 1-10

Golf
 October 25 – death of Payne Stewart (42) in an air accident
Men's professional
 Masters Tournament – José María Olazábal
 U.S. Open – Payne Stewart
 British Open – Paul Lawrie This Open is also remembered for the epic collapse of French golfer Jean van de Velde, who threw away a three–shot lead on the final hole, finding himself in a playoff which Lawrie won.
 PGA Championship – Tiger Woods
 PGA Tour money leader – Tiger Woods – $6,616,585
 PGA Tour Player of the Year – Tiger Woods
 PGA Tour Rookie of the Year – Carlos Franco
 Senior PGA Tour money leader – Bruce Fleisher – $2,515,705
 Ryder Cup – United States won 14½ to 13½ over Europe in team golf.
Men's amateur
 British Amateur – Graeme Storm
 U.S. Amateur – David Gossett
 European Amateur – Grégory Havret
Women's professional
 Nabisco Dinah Shore – Dottie Pepper
 LPGA Championship – Juli Inkster
 U.S. Women's Open – Juli Inkster
 Classique du Maurier – Karrie Webb
 LPGA Tour money leader – Karrie Webb – $1,591,959

Handball
 1999 World Men's Handball Championship – won by Sweden
 1999 World Women's Handball Championship – won by Norway

Harness racing
 North America Cup – The Panderosa
 United States Pacing Triple Crown races –
 Cane Pace – Blissful Hall
 Little Brown Jug – Blissful Hall
 Messenger Stakes – Blissful Hall
 United States Trotting Triple Crown races –
 Hambletonian – Self Possessed
 Yonkers Trot – CR Renegade
 Kentucky Futurity – Self Possessed
 Australian Inter Dominion Harness Racing Championship –
 Pacers: Sir Vancelot
 Trotters: Special Force

Horse racing
Steeplechases
 Cheltenham Gold Cup – See More Business
 Grand National – Bobbyjo
Flat races
 Australia – Melbourne Cup won by Rogan Josh
 Canada – Queen's Plate won by Woodcarver
 Dubai – Dubai World Cup won by Almutawakel	
 France – Prix de l'Arc de Triomphe won by Montjeu
 Ireland – Irish Derby Stakes won by Montjeu
 Japan – Japan Cup won by Special Week
 English Triple Crown races:
 2000 Guineas Stakes – Island Sands
 The Derby – Oath
 St Leger Stakes – Mutafaweq
 United States Triple Crown races:
 Kentucky Derby – Charismatic
 Preakness Stakes – Charismatic
 Belmont Stakes – Lemon Drop Kid
 Breeders' Cup World Thoroughbred Championships:
 Breeders' Cup Classic – Cat Thief
 Breeders' Cup Distaff – Beautiful Pleasure
 Breeders' Cup Filly & Mare Turf – Soaring Softly (inaugural running of this race)
 Breeders' Cup Juvenile – Anees
 Breeders' Cup Juvenile Fillies – Cash Run
 Breeders' Cup Mile – Silic
 Breeders' Cup Sprint – Artax
 Breeders' Cup Turf – Daylami

Ice hockey
February 13: Last ice hockey game played at the historic Maple Leaf Gardens in Toronto, the game was a 6–2 loss for the Toronto Maple Leafs to Chicago Blackhawks.
 Wayne Gretzky played his last NHL game on April 18, 1999, at Madison Square Garden where the New York Rangers lost 2–1 in overtime to the Pittsburgh Penguins
 Art Ross Trophy as the NHL's leading scorer during the regular season: Jaromir Jagr, Pittsburgh Penguins
 Hart Memorial Trophy for the NHL's Most Valuable Player:
 Jaromir Jagr – Pittsburgh Penguins
 Stanley Cup – Dallas Stars defeat the Buffalo Sabres 4 games to 2, Conn Smythe Trophy – Joe Nieuwendyk.  The Stars became the first team from the Southern United States to win the Cup.
 World Hockey Championship
 Men's champion:Czech Republic defeated Finland
 Junior Men's champion: Russia defeated Canada
 Women's champion: Canada defeated the United States
 NCAA men's ice hockey championship – University of Maine Black Bears defeat University of New Hampshire Wildcats 3–2 in overtime

Lacrosse
 Major League Lacrosse (MLL) is founded by Jake Steinfeld, Dave Morrow and Tim Robertson.
 The Toronto Rock beat the Rochester Knighthawks 13–10 to win the National Lacrosse League Championship.
 The Victoria Shamrocks win the Mann Cup.
 The Edmonton Miners win the Founders Cup.
 The Whitby Warriors win the Minto Cup.

Mixed martial arts
The following is a list of major noteworthy MMA events during 1999 in chronological order.

|-
|align=center style="border-style: none none solid solid; background: #e3e3e3"|Date
|align=center style="border-style: none none solid solid; background: #e3e3e3"|Event
|align=center style="border-style: none none solid solid; background: #e3e3e3"|Alternate Name/s
|align=center style="border-style: none none solid solid; background: #e3e3e3"|Location
|align=center style="border-style: none none solid solid; background: #e3e3e3"|Attendance
|align=center style="border-style: none none solid solid; background: #e3e3e3"|PPV Buyrate
|align=center style="border-style: none none solid solid; background: #e3e3e3"|Notes
|-align=center
|January 8
|UFC 18: The Road to the Heavyweight Title
|
| New Orleans, Louisiana, United States
|
|
|
|-align=center
|March 5
|UFC 19: Ultimate Young Guns
|
| Bay St. Louis, Mississippi, United States
|
|
|
|-align=center
|April 29
|Pride 5
|
| Nagoya, Japan
|
|
|
|-align=center
|May 7
|UFC 20: Battle for the Gold
|
| Birmingham, Alabama, United States
|
|
|
|-align=center
|July 4
|Pride 6
|
| Yokohama, Japan
|
|
|
|-align=center
|July 16
|UFC 21: Return of the Champions
|
| Cedar Rapids, Iowa, United States
|
|
|
|-align=center
|September 12
|Pride 7
|
| Yokohama, Japan
|10,031
|
|
|-align=center
|September 24
|UFC 22: Only One Can be Champion
|
| Lake Charles, Louisiana, United States
|
|
|
|-align=center
|November 19
|UFC 23: Ultimate Japan 2
|
| Tokyo, Japan
|
|
|
|-align=center
|November 21
|Pride 8
|
| Tokyo, Japan
|
|
|
|-align=center

Motorsport

Radiosport
 First IARU Region II Amateur Radio Direction Finding Championships held in Portland, Oregon, United States  This is the first IARU sanctioned international ARDF competition in the Americas.
 Third High Speed Telegraphy World Championship held in Pordenone, Italy.

Rugby league
 April 23 at Sydney, Australia – 1999 ANZAC test match is won by Australia 20–14 against New Zealand at Stadium Australia before 30,245.
 June 23 at Brisbane, Australia – 1999 State of Origin is retained by Queensland as the third and deciding match of the series is drawn 10 – 10 with New South Wales.
 September 19 in Australia – last game of the 1999 Telstra Premiership is played, including the final NRL matches as stand alone entities for the Balmain Tigers and Western Suburbs Magpies who would later merge to form the Wests Tigers.
 September 26 at Sydney, Australia – 1999 NRL season culminates in the Melbourne Storm's 20 – 18 win against the St George Illawarra Dragons in the grand final
 October 9 at Manchester, England – Super League IV culminates in St. Helens' 8 – 6 win against the Bradford Bulls in the grand final.
 November 1 at Auckland, New Zealand – 1999 Tri–Nations culminates in Australia's 22 – 20 win against New Zealand in the final.

Rugby union
 105th Five Nations Championship series, the last under the Five Nations format, is won by Scotland. The modern Six Nations format would be established the following year with the addition of Italy.
 Bledisloe Cup – Australia retains the cup after drawing the two-match series with New Zealand.
 Rugby World Cup: Australia defeat France 35–12 in the final, becoming the first nation to win the Webb Ellis Cup twice.
 Tri Nations – New Zealand

Snooker
 World Snooker Championship – Stephen Hendry beats Mark Williams 18–11
 World rankings – John Higgins remains world number one for 1999/2000

Swimming
 Fourth World Short Course Championships, held in Hong Kong, China (April 1 – 4)
 Australia wins the most medals (27), and the most gold medals (9)
 24th European LC Championships, held in Istanbul, Turkey (July 26 – August 1)
 Germany wins the most medals (23), and the most gold medals (11)
 XIII Pan American Games, held in Winnipeg, Manitoba, Canada (August 2–7)
 Eighth Pan Pacific Championships, held in Sydney, Australia (August 22–29)
 Third European SC Championships, held in Lisboa, Portugal (December 9–12)
 Germany wins the most medals (26), Sweden the most gold medals (9)
 February 17 – Australia's Susie O'Neill snapped the oldest world record in the books, clocking 2:05.37 in the women's 200m butterfly (short course) at a World Cup meet in Malmö, Sweden. The old mark, set by Mary T. Meagher on January 2, 1981, stood at 2:05.65.
 September 2 – Susie O'Neill breaks her own world record in the women's 200m butterfly (short course) at a meet in Canberra, Australia, clocking 2:04.43

Taekwondo
 World Championships held in Edmonton, Alberta, Canada

Tennis
 Grand Slam in tennis men's results:
 Australian Open – Yevgeny Kafelnikov
 French Open – Andre Agassi
 Wimbledon championships – Pete Sampras
 U.S. Open  – Andre Agassi
 Grand Slam in tennis women's results:
 Australian Open – Martina Hingis
 French Open – Steffi Graf
 Wimbledon championships – Lindsay Davenport
 U.S. Open – Serena Williams
 Davis Cup – Australia won 3–2 over France in world tennis.
 Kim Clijsters makes her WTA Tour debut.

Volleyball
 Men's World League: Italy
 Women's World Grand Prix: Russia
 Men's European Championship: Italy
 Women's European Championship: Russia

Water polo
 Men's European Championship: Hungary
 Men's World Cup: Hungary
 Women's European Championship: Italy
 Women's World Cup: Netherlands

Multi-sport events
 13th Pan American Games held in Winnipeg, Manitoba, Canada
 Seventh All–Africa Games held in Johannesburg, South Africa
 Winter Asian Games held in Gangwon, South Korea
 Ninth Pan Arab Games held in Amman, Jordan
 20th Southeast Asian Games held in Bandar Seri Begawan, Brunei Darussalam
 20th Summer Universiade held on Palma de Mallorca, Spain
 19th Winter Universiade held in Poprad, Slovakia

Awards
 Associated Press Male Athlete of the Year – Tiger Woods, PGA golf
 Associated Press Female Athlete of the Year – United States women's national soccer team, soccer

References

 
Sports by year